Hungama Digital Media is an Indian digital entertainment company, headquartered in Mumbai, India. The company was first launched in 1999 by Ashish Kacholia, Hiren Ved, Lashit Sanghvi, Rakesh Jhunjhunwala, and Neeraj Roy as an online promotions agency. The company has since grown to also serve as an aggregator, developer, publisher, and distributor of Bollywood and Asian entertainment.

The company first launched in 1999 as "Hungama.com", a promotional marketing portal. In 2000 the company acquired Indiafm and in the following years began to work marketing campaigns for companies such as Coca-Cola and Nike. In 2007 Hungama launched their gaming portal and in 2009, the company re-launched their website and company name, changing it to Hungama Digital Media Entertainment Pvt. Ltd. In 2012 Hungama Digital Media Entertainment launched Artist Aloud!, a digital platform for artists and independent music fans. It won a gold award for Best Digital Communications Campaign from the Promotion Marketing Awards of Asia (2009).

See also 
 Bollywood Hungama, a Bollywood entertainment website
 Hungama TV, an Indian children's television channel

References

External links

Record label distributors
Mass media companies based in Mumbai
Indian companies established in 1999
Mass media companies established in 1999
1999 establishments in Maharashtra